"This Boy's Fire" is a song by American rock band Santana featuring vocals from American recording artists Jennifer Lopez & Baby Bash. The song was released as the second single from the band's compilation album Ultimate Santana (2007).

Background
The collaboration between Carlos Santana and Lopez was first announced in September 2007. According to Contactmusic, it turned out "so good" which is why it was added to the final track listing of Ultimate Santana. Mexican rapper Baby Bash also features on the song, performing a rap verse.

Reception
Monsters and Critics called the song "red hot" while Stephen Thomas Erlewine noted that is "a dance number where Santana seems incidental."

Charts

Release history

References

External links
 

2008 singles
Baby Bash songs
Jennifer Lopez songs
Santana (band) songs
Songs written by Steve Morales
2007 songs
Arista Records singles
Songs written by Sean Garrett
Song recordings produced by Dr. Luke
Songs written by Baby Bash